John Randle Siddeley, 4th Baron Kenilworth (born 16 June 1954), is a British aristocrat and garden designer.

Early life
John Randle Siddeley was born on 16 June 1954. He is the fourth Baron Kenilworth, and is styled as The Rt Hon the Lord Kenilworth.

Career
He is a garden and landscape designer who operates offices in London, New York, Canada and Hong Kong.

Arms

References

1954 births
Living people
Barons in the Peerage of the United Kingdom
Kenilworth